The Aspire Dome is an indoor multi-purpose arena based in Qatar. It is located in the Aspire Academy in Doha and has the capacity to host 13 different sporting events simultaneously in a climate controlled arena, in addition to a full-sized indoor football pitch.

Events hosted
Aspire Dome was one of the venues of the 2006 Asian Games and the 2010 IAAF World Indoor Championships. In 2018, Aspire Dome was also the host of the 2018 World Artistic Gymnastics Championships.

Facilities 
The range of facilities available within the Aspire Dome include:
World Athletics-accredited Indoor Track with 200 Meters Running Track / Pole Vault / Long Jump / High Jump / Shot-put cage including 3,650 spectator seats, 240 VIP Seats and VIP room
FIFA-approved Indoor Football Pitch with 5,800 spectator seats, 230 VIP seats and 2 VIP rooms
 Olympic 50-metre Swimming Pool and Olympic Diving Pool with 252 spectator seats
 Volleyball Hall with 1,200 spectator seats
 Table Tennis Hall set-up for 9 tables with 150 spectator seats
 Two Multi-Sports Halls for Basketball / Volleyball / Handball / Futsal with 1,200 and 410 spectator seats respectively
 Fencing / Gymnastics Hall with 6 fencing strips and Mini Gymnastics area
 Squash Courts including 7 ASB squash courts, 1 Central Glass court and warm-up area
 Gymnasiums including the Power Gym, Strength & Conditioning Gym, Cardio Gym, Staff Gym & Spa
 Sports Science Labs including Biochemistry Lab, Altitude Lab, Physiology Lab, Biomechanics Lab and Anthropometry Lab
 Sports Psychology Labs including four Champions Psychology Labs
 Offices including meeting rooms, conference rooms and VIP corporate suites

See also
 Aspire Academy
 Aspire Zone

References

External links

 

Indoor arenas in Qatar
Indoor track and field venues
Sports venues in Qatar
Aspire Academy